Gariaband is a town and a Nagar Palika in Gariaband district in the state of Chhattisgarh, India. It is district headquarter of the Gariaband district.

The nearest river that flows to this town is the Pairi River, which is 4 km away from this place. There is a major temple called Bhooteshwarnath. 

It is connected to major cities by paved double lane roads, and is about  80 km from Mahasamund, 90 km from Raipur the capital of Chhattisgarh.

Etymology 
Gariaband derived its name from Gīrī which translates to mountains or hills. Gariaband is a tribal area and the town is surrounded by hills. Gīrīband or Garīaband literally translates to Surrounded by Hills.

References

gariaband.gov.in

External links
Districts of Chhattisgarh
chhattisgarhgyan.in

Gariaband district
Cities and towns in Gariaband district